This is a list of shopping malls in Saint Petersburg, Russia

Malls in Saint Petersburg

As of December 2017, Saint Petersburg had 139 malls.

References

External links
Leading brands in  Saint-Petersburg malls

Shopping malls in Russia
Russia
Shopping malls
Shopping malls
Saint Petersburg-related lists